Ronnie Chan Chi-chung  (born 1949) is a Hong Kong businessman.

Education
Chan earned bachelor's and master's degrees in biology from a California State University. He received an MBA from the University of Southern California in 1976.

Chan was given honorary doctorates by Tel Aviv University, the Hong Kong University of Science and Technology, and the Chinese University of Hong Kong.

Career
In 1991, he became the chairman of Hang Lung Group and its subsidiary Hang Lung Properties. As of 2014, it was one of the largest real estate developers in Hong Kong. He succeeded the chairman position in the companies from his uncle. He is also the vice-president of the Real Estate Developers Association of Hong Kong, a co-chairman of the Asia Society and chairman of its Hong Kong Center, and an advisor to the China Development Research Foundation of the State Council of the People's Republic of China.

He has served on the governing or advisory bodies of several think-tanks and universities, including China Foreign Affairs University, the Hong Kong University of Science and Technology and his alma mater, the University of Southern California.

He was a director of Enron Corporation and a member of its audit committee when it filed for bankruptcy as a result of fraud. In November 2009, he attended the Horasis Global China Business Meeting in Lisbon, where his criticisms of American financial policy garnered widespread attention.

Political views
Through his companies' multiple votes on Hong Kong's democratic 'Election Committee', Chan supported Carrie Lam for the role of Chief Executive. But in 2019, during the massive protests that rocked the territory, he opined that having a civil servant (as she was) in the role was the “most ridiculous thing” and that Lam's "unwise policies" had contributed to the unrest, which he emphasised was caused by political, not social, issues. He also supported Leung Chun-ying in the 2013 election for chief executive.

He has stated that Hongkongers' "DNA is different from the mainlanders’ because many escaped from there," noting that "Hong Kong people cherish freedom, (…) while mainland Chinese people value patriotism and nationalism."

Philanthropy
In 1996, Chan began providing yearly financial assistance to needy students at top universities in China.

In September 2014, Chan's family, through their Morningside Foundation, donated US$350 million and US$20 million to Harvard University and the University of Southern California, respectively.

In 2021, a US$175 million gift was bestowed by Morningside on the University of Massachusetts Medical School in Worcester, which was subsequently renamed UMass Chan Medical School. The constituent schools were likewise renamed to the T.H. Chan School of Medicine, the Tan Chingfen Graduate School of Nursing, and the Morningside Graduate School of Biomedical Sciences.

Personal life
Chan's brother Gerald Chan is also a director of Hang Lung Group.

Chan is married to Barbara Chan and has two sons.

In 2004, Chan's son Adriel Chan received his bachelor's degree in international relations from USC. Chan's other son Adley Chan earned his bachelor's degree in sociology, as well as bachelor's, master's, and doctorate degrees in occupational therapy from USC.

References

External links
 Chairman of Hang Lung Group Limited
 Committee of 100 Member Roster
 

1949 births
Living people
Hong Kong businesspeople
Hong Kong chief executives
Marshall School of Business alumni
Hang Lung Group
Members of Committee of 100
Enron people
Hong Kong chairpersons of corporations
Hong Kong corporate directors
Members of the Election Committee of Hong Kong, 2007–2012
Members of the Election Committee of Hong Kong, 2012–2017
Alumni of St. Paul's Co-educational College
Recipients of the Grand Bauhinia Medal
Peterson Institute for International Economics